Underwood Park may refer to:
Underwood Park (Paisley), a former association football ground in Scotland, used by Abercorn FC and the Scotland national team
Underwood Park, Rochedale, a sports ground in Rochedale, Queensland, Australia